The Common Law is a 1923 American silent drama film directed by George Archainbaud and starring Corinne Griffith and Conway Tearle. Based upon the novel of the same name by Robert William Chambers, the film was produced and released by Selznick Pictures Corporation.

The novel was first filmed as The Common Law in 1916 with Clara Kimball Young as Valerie West. Conway Tearle played the role of Neville in both the 1916 and 1923 films. It was later remade as the talkie The Common Law in 1931 with Constance Bennett and Joel McCrea in the lead roles.

Plot
Valerie West (Griffith), hungry and tired, presents herself as a model at the studio of painter Louis Neville (Tearle), which he shares with two other artists. When she is asked whether she poses draped or undraped, she replies that she will do whatever is expected of models. After some time and several daring poses, Louis realizes that he is in love with her. However, the wealthy Neville family opposes any marriage between the two. Valerie makes a sacrifice by agreeing to not marry Louis, but promises him that she will become his common law wife. When Cardemon (Myers) tries to kiss the model, she lashes him with a whip. In the end, a satisfactory resolution is reached regarding Valerie and Henry.

Cast

Preservation
With no copies of The Common Law located in any film archives, it is a lost film.

References

External links

Lobby cards: #1 (archived), #2 (archived), and #3 card (archived)
Still at silenthollywood.com
Still at alamy.com

1923 films
Lost American films
American silent feature films
American black-and-white films
1920s English-language films
Films based on American novels
Films based on works by Robert W. Chambers
Selznick Pictures films
Silent American drama films
Films directed by George Archainbaud
1920s American films